Roddey is a surname. Notable people with the surname include:

Jim Roddey (born 1935), American businessman and politician
Phillip Roddey (1826–1897), American Civil War brigadier general

See also
Rodney (name)
Roddy